Scrub wallaby often refers to the Black-striped wallaby (Macropus dorsalis).

Scrub wallaby may also loosely refer to one of these other marsupials that often live in scrubland or brushland:

Wallabies (genera Macropus and Notamacropus) 
 Red-necked wallaby or Bennett's wallaby (Macropus rufogriseus)
 Tammar wallaby (Notamacropus eugenii)
 Western brush wallaby, also "western scrub wallaby" or "black-gloved wallaby" (Macropus irma)

Pademelons (genus Thylogale) 
 Any pademelon, including:
 Tasmanian pademelon (Thylogale billardierii)